Mitragyna diversifolia is a tree species in the family Rubiaceae and found in Asia. The Catalogue of Life lists no subspecies.

Description

Mitragyna diversifolia is a deciduous under-story tree, that reaches up to 15 m in height.  The branches are angled and cylindrical. The leaves are ovate-oblong to elliptic-ovate, averaging 146 × 93 mm in size, obtuse apex to shortly acuminate. The yellow corolla has white lobes. The fruit in the form of a capsule of 3–4 mm.

Distribution
It is distributed through the forests of China (Yunnan), Cambodia, Indonesia, Laos, Burma, the Philippines, Thailand and Vietnam.

Uses
The genus mitragyna has been used traditionally to alleviate symptoms of fever, coughing, diarrhea, muscular pain and deworming, although antioxidant and antimicrobial properties have also been found. Typically these are consumed as a whole leaf or powder form, although gel-capsules, containing powder, are also used. Mitragyna diversifolia has been shown to possess pharmacological antidiarrheal properties, as well as analgesic properties.

Gallery

References

External links
 
 
 IPNI: Mitragyna diversifolia (accessed 2/7/2017)

Mitragyna
Flora of Indo-China
Trees of Vietnam